The 4th Tank Regiment is a tank regiment of the Italian Army based in Persano in Campania. Originally the regiment, like all Italian tank units, was part of the infantry, but since 1 June 1999 it is part of the cavalry. Operationally the regiment is assigned to the Bersaglieri Brigade "Garibaldi".

History

Formation 
The regiment was formed on 15 September 1936 in Rome as 4th Tank Infantry Regiment with six battalions: VIII, IX, X, and XII assault tanks battalions and the II and V breach tanks battalion.  The assault tanks battalions fielded L3/35 tankettes, while the breach tanks battalion fielded Fiat 3000 light tanks. The regiment also had oversight over a L3/35 equipped tank company in Sardinia. The regiment's initial structure was:

 4th Tank Infantry Regiment, in Rome
 VIII Assault Tanks Battalion "Bettoia", in Rome (L3/35 tankettes)
 IX Assault Tanks Battalion "Guadagni", in Bari (L3/35 tankettes)
 X Assault Tanks Battalion "Menzinger", in Caserta (L3/35 tankettes)
 XII Assault Tanks Battalion "Cangialosi", in Palermo (L3/35 tankettes)
 II Breach Tanks Battalion, in Rome (Fiat 3000 light tanks)
 V Breach Tanks Battalion, in Rome (Fiat 3000 light tanks)
 Assault Tanks Company "Sardegna", in Cagliari (L3/35 tankettes)
 4th Tank Training Center, in Rome
 4th Tank Materiel Maintenance Workshop, in Rome

On 15 July 1937 the regiment ceded the II Breach Tanks Battalion to the forming 31st Tank Infantry Regiment. During the same year the regiment raised two battalions for service in Libya: the XX Assault Tanks Battalion on 5 June and XXI Assault Tanks Battalion on 1 October. For their service during the Western Desert Campaign the XX and XXI assault tanks battalions were each awarded a Bronze Medal of Military Valour, which are nowadays displayed on the flag of the 4th Tank Regiment. On 30 November the V Breach Tanks Battalion moved from Rome to Riva del Garda and joined the 1st Tank Infantry Regiment. On 30 May 1939 the VIII Assault Tanks Battalion "Bettoia" and the X Assault Tanks Battalion "Menzinger" were transferred to Albania, where they joined the 31st Tank Infantry Regiment, which in turn ceded one of its two breach tanks battalions, namely the CCCXII (former II Breach Tank Battalion) to the 4th Regiment. In fall 1939 the IX Assault Tanks Battalion "Guadagni" was transferred to Libya, where it joined the XXII Army Corps. In 1940 the tank company in Sardinia was expanded to battalion and renamed XIII Assault Tanks Battalion "Sardegna". As the Fiat 3000 light tanks were obsolete the CCCXII battalion was transferred as garrison unit to Rhodes in the Italian Islands of the Aegean on 30 March 1940. After having ceded the VIII Assault Tanks Battalion "Bettoia" the 4th regiment raised a new battalion named VIII Assault Tanks Battalion bis. In April 1940 tank battalions were renamed and so the regiment entered World War II with the following structure:

 4th Tank Infantry Regiment, in Rome
 VIII Tank Battalion "L" bis (L3/35 tankettes)
 XII Tank Battalion "L" (L3/35 tankettes)
 XIII Tank Battalion "L" (L3/35 tankettes)
 4th Tank Training Center, in Rome
 4th Tank Materiel Maintenance Workshop, in Rome

World War II 
On 11 June 1940, the day after Italy's entry into World War II, the regiment was sent to Libya. It arrived on 8 July 1940 in Benghazi with the I Tank Battalion "M" and II Tank Battalion "M", both equipped with M11/39 tanks. The I and II tank battalions "M" had been formed by the 32nd Tank Infantry Regiment with personnel from the disbanded III and IV breach tanks battalions. The regiment also received the LXIII Tank Battalion "L" after arriving in the colony. The regiment's tanks clashed with British units for the first time on 5 August 1940 near Sidi Azeiz. On 29 August 1940 all tank battalions in Libya were combined in three formations of the Babini Group. The four battalions of the "LX"-series had been formed in Libya after the war's outbreak by the XX Tank Battalion "L" in Tripolitania respectively the XXI Tank Battalion "L" in Cyrenaica:

 Libyan Tank Command, General Valentino Babini
 I Tankers Grouping (Aresca Group), Colonel Pietro Aresca, commander of the 4th Tank Infantry Regiment
 I Tank Battalion "M" (M11/39 tanks)
 XXI Tank Battalion "L" (L3/35 tankettes)
 LXII Tank Battalion "L" (L3/35 tankettes)
 LXIII Tank Battalion "L" (L3/35 tankettes)
 II Tankers Grouping (Trivioli Group), Colonel Antonio Trivioli
 II Tank Battalion "M" (minus one company; M11/39 tanks)
 IX Tank Battalion "L" (L3/35 tankettes)
 XX Tank Battalion "L" (L3/35 tankettes)
 LXI Tank Battalion "L" (L3/35 tankettes)
 Mixed Tank Battalion
 1x "M" company (from the II Tank Battalion "M")
 1x "L" company (from the LX Tank Battalion "L")
 LX Tank Battalion "L" (minus one company; L3/35 tankettes; for the XXI Army Corps)

The I Tankers Grouping participated in the Italian invasion of Egypt in September, but stopped in Sidi Barrani, where the Italian units dug in. When the British counterattack began on 9 December 1940 the Italian tank units were deployed piecemeal and easily defeated by the more numerous and better British tanks. The first two battalions to be annihilated were the II Tank Battalion "M" during the early morning surprise Attack on Nibeiwa and the IX Tank Battalion "L" in the early afternoon of the same day as prelude to the Battle of Sidi Barrani.

With the Italian forces retreating from Sidi Barrani to Bardia tanks of the I Tank Battalion "M" were sent forward to Sollum and the Halfaya Pass to delay the British advance. By 15 December both locations were in British hands and the remnants I Tank Battalion "M" retreated to Tobruk, while the LX Tank Battalion "L" was destroyed at Buq Buq. The III Tank Battalion "M", with the army's most modern tanks withdrew to Mechili, while the XXI Tank Battalion "L" left its tankettes at Tobruk and moved to Benghazi to mount on M13/40 tanks that had arrived along with the V Tank Battalion "M" with M13/40 tanks and the V Tank Battalion "L" with L3/35 tankettes from Italy.

During the Battle of Bardia the V, XX, LXI, and LXII tank battalions "L" were destroyed. On 7 January 1941 the headquarter of the 4th Tank Infantry Regiment with the remnants of the I Tank Battalion "M" and the LXIII Tank Battalion "L" were surrounded with other Italian forces at Tobruk. On 20 January during the British capture of Tobruk the position of the 4th regiment was overrun by the 19th Australian Brigade with such ferocity that 70% of the officers, including both battalion commanders, and 50% of the troops of the regiment were killed in action. On 13 January the VI Tank Battalion "M" with M13/40 tanks had arrived from Italy and joined the Babini Group with its V and XXI tank battalions "M". On 24 January the Babini Group clashed inconclusively with the 7th British Armoured Division at Mechili. After Mechili the Italian army retreated further East to Beda Fomm, where the British successfully cut off the line of retreat and destroyed the Italian 10th Army with its III, V, VI, and XXI tank battalions "M" on 6-7 February during the Battle of Beda Fomm.

Between 10 June 1940 and 21 January 1941 the 4th Tank Infantry Regiment and the III and V tank battalions' casualties were: 15 officers killed and 14 wounded out of 34, and 148 soldiers killed and 244 wounded out of 538. For its short but bloody service in North Africa the regiment was awarded a Gold Medal of Military Valour, while the XX and XXI tank battalions "L", which the 4th regiment had raised before the war, were each awarded a Bronze Medal of Military Valour. As of 2019 all three medals are attached to the 4th Tank Regiment's flag and displayed on the regiment's coat of arms. The III Tank Battalion M was also awarded a Gold Medal of Military Valour, which is attached to the 32nd Tank Regiment's flag, while the Silver Medal of Military Valour awarded to the V Tank Battalion M is attached to the flag of the suspended 5th Tank Battalion "M.O. Chiamenti".

The regiment was officially declared lost on 25 January 1941 and reformed on 15 March 1941 in Rome as training unit. For the remainder of the war the regiment raised and trained tank battalions for other units. The first unit the regiment raised was the VIII Tank Battalion "M" with M13/40 tanks, which joined the 32nd Tank Infantry Regiment in North Africa. On 30 April 1941 the VIII Tank Battalion "L" bis was renamed XI Tank Battalion "M" after being equipped with M13/40 tanks. The XI battalion then joined the 133rd Tank Infantry Regiment. In the meantime the regiment continued to raise new units:

 Command Company of the 132nd Tank Infantry Regiment (1 June 1941 transferred to Italian Libya)
 I Tank Battalion "R35" (captured French Renault R35 light tanks, renamed CI Tank Battalion "R35" and transferred to the 131st Tank Infantry Regiment in July 1941)
 II Tank Battalion "R35" (captured French R35 light tanks, renamed CII Tank Battalion "R35" and transferred to the 131st Tank Infantry Regiment in July 1941)
 CC Tank Battalion "S35" (captured French SOMUA S35 tanks, transferred to the 131st Tank Infantry Regiment in July 1941)
 III Flamethrower Tank Battalion (L3 Lf tanks, activated in December 1941)
 XVII Tank Battalion "M" (M14/41 tanks, activated on 1 February 1942, transferred to the 31st Tank Infantry Regiment)

In July 1943 the regiment began with the formation of the II Tank Battalion "P" with new P 40 tanks, but after Italy changed sides with the Armistice of Cassibile on 8 September 1943 the 4th Tank Infantry Regiment was disbanded by the Germans and its materiel transferred to Wehrmacht units.

Cold War 
On 1 January 1953 the regiment was raised again as 4th Tankers Regiment and joined the Armored Division "Pozzuolo del Friuli" in Rome. In the following weeks the regiment activated three battalions armed with M26 Pershing tanks. On 1 May 1958 the regiment was reorganized and renamed as 4th Armored Infantry Regiment, transferred to Legnano and joined the Infantry Division "Legnano".

20th Tank Battalion "M.O. Pentimalli" 

During the 1975 army reform the 4th Armored Infantry Regiment was disbanded on 29 October 1975 and its II Bersaglieri Battalion became the 2nd Bersaglieri Battalion "Governolo", while the regiment's XX Tank Battalion became the 20th Tank Battalion "M.O. Pentimalli", which received the flag and traditions of the disbanded regiment. The battalion's number commemorated the XX Tank Battalion "L", which had served with the 4th regiment in the early stages of the Western Desert Campaign. Tank and armored battalions created during the 1975 army reform were all named for officers, soldiers and partisans, who were posthumously awarded Italy's highest military honor the Gold Medal of Military Valour during World War II. The 20th Tank Battalion's name commemorated XI Tank Battalion "M13/40", 133rd Tank Infantry Regiment Second lieutenant Livio Pentimalli, who had distinguished himself during the Battle of Gazala and was killed in action on 21 June 1941 during the Axis capture of Tobruk. Equipped with Leopard 1A2 main battle tanks the battalion joined the Mechanized Brigade "Legnano".

Recent times 
After the end of the Cold War the Italian Army began to draw down its forces and therefore the "Pentimalli" battalion was disbanded on 30 January 1991. However as the 4th Tank Regiment is the highest decorated tank unit of the Italian Army it was decided to raise it again and so on 18 September 1992 the 11th Tank Battalion "M.O. Calzecchi" in Ozzano dell'Emilia of the Mechanized Brigade "Friuli" entered the reraised 4th Tank Regiment. On 1 September 1993 the 6th Tank Battalion "M.O. Scapuzzi" in Civitavecchia of the Mechanized Brigade "Granatieri di Sardegna" was renamed 4th Tank Regiment, while the tank regiment of the "Friuli" brigade was renamed 33rd Tank Regiment. On 9 October 1995 the regiment disbanded in Civitavecchia and transferred its flag and name to the 31st Tank Regiment in Bellinzago Novarese, which was a unit of the Armored Brigade "Centauro". In 1996 the regiment's battalion returned to use the name 20th Tank Battalion "M.O. Pentimalli".

When the Centauro disbanded on 5 October 2002 the 4th Tank Regiment joined the 132nd Armored Brigade "Ariete". On 11 July 2013 the 4th Tank Regiment disbanded in Bellinzago Novarese and its name and flag were transferred to the 131st Tank Regiment of the Bersaglieri Brigade "Garibaldi" in Persano in Southern Italy.

Current structure 

As of 2022 the 4th Tank Regiment consists of:

  Regimental Command, in Persano
 Command and Logistic Support Company
 20th Tank Battalion "M.O. Pentimalli"
 1st Tank Company (13x Ariete AMV main battle tanks)
 2nd Tank Company (13x Ariete AMV main battle tanks)
 3rd Tank Company (13x Ariete AMV main battle tanks)
 4th Tank Company (Disbanded)

The Command and Logistic Support Company fields the following platoons: C3 Platoon, Transport and Materiel Platoon, Medical Platoon, and Commissariat Platoon. In total the regiment fields 41x Ariete AMV main battle tanks: 13x per company, plus one for the battalion commander and one for the regiment commander.

See also 
 Bersaglieri Brigade "Garibaldi"

External links
Italian Army Website: 4° Reggimento Carri

References

Tank Regiments of Italy